Siskiwitia falcata is a moth in the family Cosmopterigidae. It was described by Ronald W. Hodges in 1978. It is found in North America, where it has been recorded from Florida.

The wingspan is about 6 mm. Adults have been recorded on wing from April to June.

References

Moths described in 1978
Chrysopeleiinae